is a 1989 Japanese film directed by Junji Sakamoto.

Cast
Hidekazu Akai 
Haruko Sagara 
Akaji Maro
Yoshio Harada

Awards and nominations
11th Yokohama Film Festival 
Won: Best Film
Won: Best New Director - Junji Sakamoto
Won: Best Supporting Actor - Yoshio Harada
Won: Best Supporting Actress - Haruko Sagara
Won: Best Newcomer - Hidekazu Akai

References

External links
 

1989 films
Japanese boxing films
Films directed by Junji Sakamoto
1980s Japanese-language films
1980s sports films
1989 directorial debut films
1980s Japanese films